Drexell's Class is an American sitcom that aired Thursday at 8:30 on Fox as part of its 1991–92 lineup. The show was created by Andrew Nicholls and Darrell Vickers.

Synopsis
Drexell's Class starred Dabney Coleman as Otis Drexell, a fifth-grade teacher at fictional Grantwood Elementary School in Cedar Bluffs, Iowa.  Drexell's backstory revealed that he was a corporate raider who lost a large amount of money on a failed venture, dodged his taxes, and was arrested. At his sentencing, he was offered a suspended sentence if he worked as a teacher at the understaffed school to pay off his back taxes. Drexell was a divorced man whose two daughters lived with him. The cast also included two antagonists, rival teacher Roscoe Davis (Dakin Matthews) and Principal Francine Itkin (Randy Graff), who was later succeeded by Principal Marylin Ridge (Edie McClurg).

One of Drexell's few friends at the school was P.E. teacher George (Cleavant Derricks), who shared Drexell's love of sports and beer. Most episodes revolved around Drexell's unwillingness to teach his students lessons by the book, or trying to be a good father to his daughters. On one occasion, Drexell's ex-wife made an appearance; Drexell hoped she would remarry so he could stop paying alimony.

Cast
Dabney Coleman as Otis Drexell
Randy Graff as Principal Francine E. Itkin
Dakin Matthews as Roscoe Davis
Jason Biggs as Willie Trancas
Heidi Zeigler as Nicole Finnigan
Damian Cagnolatti as Kenny Sanders
Matthew Lawrence as Walker
A. J. Langer as Melissa Drexell
Brittany Murphy as Brenda Drexell
Edie McClurg as Principal Marilyn Ridge
Cleavant Derricks as George Foster
Phil Buckman as Slash
Jacqueline Donnelly as Bernadette
Matthew Slowik as Lionel

Episodes

Awards and nominations

In popular culture
The Simpsons made light of the show's cancellation in their 1992 "Treehouse of Horror III" episode with a "graveyard of cancelled shows". A tombstone of Drexell's Class is featured alongside tombstones of Fish Police, Capitol Critters, and Family Dog.

References
Brooks, Tim and Marsh, Earle, The Complete Directory to Prime Time Network and Cable TV Shows

External links
 
 

1990s American school television series
1990s American sitcoms
1990s American workplace comedy television series
1991 American television series debuts
1992 American television series endings
Elementary school television series
English-language television shows
Fox Broadcasting Company original programming
Television series about educators
Television series by 20th Century Fox Television
Television shows set in Iowa